Apyretina is a genus of African crab spiders that was first described by Embrik Strand in 1929.

Species
 it contains five species, found on Madagascar:
Apyretina catenulata (Simon, 1903) – Madagascar
Apyretina nigra (Simon, 1903) – Madagascar
Apyretina pentagona (Simon, 1895) (type) – Madagascar
Apyretina quinquenotata (Simon, 1903) – Madagascar
Apyretina tessera (Simon, 1903) – Madagascar

See also
 List of Thomisidae species

References

Further reading

Araneomorphae genera
Spiders of Madagascar
Taxa named by Embrik Strand
Thomisidae